Go Bang or variants may refer to:

 Go-Bang, an 1894 stage musical by Adrian Ross and F. Osmond Carr
 Gomoku or Go Bang, a game related to Pente
"Go Bang! #5," a 1982 single by Dinosaur L from the album 24→24 Music.
Go-Bang's, Japanese girl group
Go Bang!, a 1988 album by Shriekback
"Go Bang" (song), a 2017 song by Pnau

See also 
 Let's Go Bang, an album by Jennifer Love Hewitt
 Goban, the board used for the game of Go